"Light It Up" is a 2008 promotional single and the first single by the hard rock band Rev Theory from their second album of the same name.  It was officially released for digital download on March 25 and for radio airplay in the fall of 2008. Since August 2008, the song has peaked at #25 on Billboard's Hot Mainstream Rock Tracks and #74 on The Billboard 200.

The song was featured as one of the two theme songs for the 2008 WWE pay-per-view event WrestleMania XXIV. The song is also featured in EA Sports' NASCAR 09. On December 23, 2008, it became available as downloadable content for the game Guitar Hero World Tour. On February 5, 2009, the song was featured as downloadable content in the iPhone OS game Tap Tap Revenge.

Track listing
"Light It Up" – 4:12

References

2008 songs
2008 singles
Rev Theory songs
Interscope Records singles
Song articles with missing songwriters
Song recordings produced by Josh Abraham
Alternative metal songs
American heavy metal songs